The year 1979 saw a number of significant events in radio broadcasting history.

Events
September: KDWB-FM in Minneapolis, Minnesota breaks away from their Top 40 AM sister, becoming album-oriented rock as "K101".
October 8-November 3: The engineers and airstaff of WCCO-AM-FM-TV go on strike.
October 22: Pittsburgh court receives a $7 million libel lawsuit from county politician Cyril Wecht over remarks the city controller made of him during a radio interview.

Debuts
Undated: WIXK-FM signs on the air.
 February 5: Sears Radio Theater debuts on CBS. 
 November 5: The radio news program Morning Edition premieres on National Public Radio.
Undated: In Albuquerque, New Mexico, long time rocker KRST flips to country music, becoming the city's first FM country radio station.  KRST is still playing country music.

Endings
November 4 - KUAC Ends AM after 12 years. It's replaced by Morning Edition (see Above in Debuts)

Births
 May 4 - Wes Butters, British broadcaster
 July 23 - Peter Rosenberg, American radio personality

Deaths
April 9: Staats Cotsworth, 71, actor perhaps best known for playing the title role in Casey, Crime Photographer. 
October 27: Charles Coughlin, 88, Canadian-born Roman Catholic priest who used radio to reach a mass audience during the 1930s. This radio program included praises of Adolf Hitler and Benito Mussolini.

References

 
Radio by year